The Men's javelin throw competition at the 2012 Summer Olympics in London, United Kingdom. The event was held at the Olympic Stadium on 8–11 August.

Competition format
Each athlete receives three throws in the qualifying round. All who achieve the qualifying distance progress to the final. If fewer than twelve athletes achieve this mark, then the twelve furthest throwing athletes reach the final. Each finalist is allowed three throws in last round, with the top eight athletes after that point being given three further attempts.

Summary
Seven athletes hit the automatic qualifying mark, two on their first attempt.  80.39 was the last qualifier.  Julius Yego set a new national record for Kenya.  With his one throw, Vítězslav Veselý improved his 2012 world lead to 88.34.

In the first round of the final, 19-year-old world junior champion Keshorn Walcott, only the 10th place qualifier, took the lead with an 83.51 national record for Trinidad and Tobago.  Spiridon Lebesis was the only other competitor over 80 m in that round.  In the second round Walcott improved his record out to 84.58m (277 feet 10 inches). 2007 World Champion Tero Pitkämäki moved into second place and two-time defending champion Andreas Thorkildsen (Norway) moved into third, but that was to be his best throw.  In the third round Oleksandr Pyatnytsya threw 84.51, just 7 cm out of Walcott's lead.  Nobody made a move in the fourth round.  In the fifth round Antti Ruuskanen threw 84.12 to move into third place.  In the final round Vesely put out his best throw of the competition, but his 83.34 was only good enough for 4th place, exactly 5 meters behind his lone throw in the qualifying round the day before. Walcott's mark of 84.58 was the shortest winning throw since the 1988 Seoul Olympics - the first with the [then] new, re-balanced javelin - when Tapio Korjus (Finland) won with 84.28m.

On August 9, 2016, Oleksandr Pyatnytsya was disqualified after his anti-doping test sample was reanalyzed and found positive (dehydrochlormethyltestosterone). On February 24, 2017  Antti Ruuskanen received the silver medal in Finland. Vítězslav Veselý received the bronze medal during Golden Spike Ostrava on 28 June 2017.

Schedule

All times are British Summer Time (UTC+1)

Records
, the existing World and Olympic records were as follows:

The Following new National records were set during this competition

Results

Qualifying round
Qual. rule: qualification standard 82.00m (Q) or at least best 12 qualified (q).

Final

References

˜˜˜˜

Athletics at the 2012 Summer Olympics
Javelin throw at the Olympics
Men's events at the 2012 Summer Olympics